Leonard Zablow is an American biologist and an Elected Fellow of the American Association for the Advancement of Science since 1967.

References

Living people
Fellows of the American Association for the Advancement of Science
21st-century American biologists
Year of birth missing (living people)